"The Sword of Villon" is a 1956 American TV episode of the Screen Directors Playhouse series. Errol Flynn played Francois Villon.

Plot
Francois Villon learns of a plot to assassinate the king, and gathers his followers to stop the plot and save the king's life.

Cast
Errol Flynn as Francois Villon
Hillary Brooke as Countess
Pamela Duncan as Velvet
Murvyn Vye as Bagot
Lois Collier as Lady Elaine
Mark Dana as Count
Richard Avonde as 1st. Bully
Sol Gorss as 2nd. Bully
Nesdon Booth as Tavernkeeper

Production
The show was a collaboration between the Screen Directors Guild, the Hal Roach Studios and the J Walter Thompson advertising agency. In January 1956 the Screen Directors Playhouse announced they had signed Errol Flynn to play Francois Villon and it would be directed by Don Weis.

Flynn made it just prior to his own show The Errol Flynn Theatre.

Reception
Filmink magazine later wrote the episode was "more of interest as a curiosity piece than anything else but it’s not awful by any means and Errol seems engaged. The concept was actually strong enough to support a feature film."

References

External links
Sword of Villon at IMDb
Sword of Villon at BFI

1956 American television episodes